The gens Jucundia was an obscure plebeian family at ancient Rome.  No members of this gens are mentioned in ancient writers, but a number are known from inscriptions.

Origin
The nomen Jucundius is derived from the cognomen Jucundus, originally referring to someone pleasant or agreeable.  It belongs to a class of surnames derived from the character of an individual.

Members

 Gaius Jucundius Verus, made an offering to Jupiter at Alburnus Major in Dacia, some time in the second century.
 Tiberius Jucundius Victorinus, made an offering to Mercury, recorded in an inscription found at Großkrotzenburg, dating between AD 101 and 260.
 Jucundius Juvenalis, a cornicularius, or adjutant, in an uncertain military unit, who made an offering to Jupiter Optimus Maximus at Potaissa in Dacia, roughly between AD 150 and 270.
 Gaius Jucundius Similis, a soldier in the Legio XXX Ulpia Victrix, who made an offering to Jupiter Optimus Maximus at Bonna in Germania Inferior in AD 182.
 Jucundia Rogata, buried at Ammaedara in Africa Proconsularis, aged thirty-five, with a monument from her husband, Nonius Saturninus.
 Jucundius, named in an inscription from Gallia Belgica.
 Jucundius, named in an inscription from Novaesium in Germania Inferior.
 Marcus Jucundius Primus Vocontius, buried at Lugdunum in Gallia Lugdunensis, with a monument from his friend, Marcus Sollius Epaphroditus.
 Gaius Jucundius C. f. Severianus, dedicated a monument at Vasio in Gallia Narbonensis for his father, Gaius Jucundius Severus.
 Gaius Jucundius Severus, buried at Vasio, aged twenty-nine years, eight months, and four days, with a monument dedicated by his son, Gaius Jucundius Severianus.
 Lucius Jucundius Titullus, made an offering commemorated in an inscription found at Nestier, formerly part of Gallia Aquitania.

See also
 List of Roman gentes
 Jucundus (disambiguation)

References

Bibliography
 Theodor Mommsen et alii, Corpus Inscriptionum Latinarum (The Body of Latin Inscriptions, abbreviated CIL), Berlin-Brandenburgische Akademie der Wissenschaften (1853–present).
 René Cagnat et alii, L'Année épigraphique (The Year in Epigraphy, abbreviated AE), Presses Universitaires de France (1888–present).
 George Davis Chase, "The Origin of Roman Praenomina", in Harvard Studies in Classical Philology, vol. VIII, pp. 103–184 (1897).
 John C. Traupman, The New College Latin & English Dictionary, Bantam Books, New York (1995).
 Jochen Kütter, Graffiti auf römischer Gefäßkeramik aus Neuss, Aachen (2008).

Roman gentes